Comanthosphace  is a genus of plants in the family Lamiaceae, first described in 1877. It is native to East Asia (China, Taiwan, Japan).

Comanthosphace formosana Ohwi — Taiwan
Comanthosphace japonica (Miq.) S.Moore — Japan, China (Anhui, Guangdong, Jiangsu, Jiangxi)
Comanthosphace nanchuanensis C.Y.Wu & H.W.Li — China (Sichuan)
Comanthosphace ningpoensis (Hemsl.) Hand.-Mazz. — China (Anhui, Guizhou, Hubei, Hunan, Jiangxi, Zhejiang)
Comanthosphace stellipila (Miq.) S.Moore ex Briq. — Japan (Honshu, Shikoku)

References

Lamiaceae
Lamiaceae genera